General Alberto Herrera y Franchi (September 1, 1874 – March 18, 1954) was the interim President of Cuba from August 12 to August 13, 1933.

Biography
General Herrera was the Secretary of War & Navy during the presidency of Gerardo Machado.  He was married to Ofelia Rodríguez Arango and they had three children, Alberto, Rodolfo and Ofelia Herrera y Rodríguez-Arango.

Role in Machado's administration and the 1933 Revolution
On August 11, 1933, when Cuban Army rebels took hold of the Castillo de la Real Fuerza, General Herrera attended the fortress in order to reach a resolution or pact with the rebels. He met with Erasmo Delgado. After much debate and given that the rebels did not want Herrera to secure the presidency after Machado’s departure, it was agreed that given his powers as General the actions committed by the rebels did not constitute a revolt but were ordered on his behalf.

After Machado’s departure
After the departure of Machado on August 12, 1933, a power vacuum was created and Sumner Welles initially proposed the replacement of Machado with Herrera. Unfortunately, the army rebels were not in accord with this proposal. Sumner Welles noted on August 12, 1933

"After the promise of certain of the Army leaders at 4 o'clock this morning that they would agree to the ad interim Presidency of any Cuban provided President Machado would retire from the office. I was advised at 7 that they had again changed their minds and would accept anyone other than General Herrera to whom they were personally devoted but whom they feared the great mass of the opposition would not accept on account of his past intimate connection with President Machado."

As a result, Sumner Welles devised a new plan in which Herrera would remain the only Cabinet member who would not resign from Machado's administration thus by default becoming the interim President solely for the purpose of appointing Carlos Manuel de Céspedes y Quesada, the son of Carlos Manuel de Céspedes (Father of the Country), as member of Herrera's Cabinet. Immediately thereafter, Herrera would resign and as Carlos Manuel de Céspedes y Quesada would be the only one left in the Cabinet, he would by default become the new President. Sumner Welles' intention was to keep a form of constitutional continuance between the departure of Machado and the installation of a new government. Some scholars, such as Rolando Rodriguez, have questioned whether the appointment of Carlos Manuel de Céspedes y Quesada as a Cabinet member followed by his appointment as President thereafter was constitutional at all. 
After the appointment of Carlos Manuel de Cespedes y Quesada as President, Herrera fled to the Hotel Nacional and later secured passage to flee Cuba.

References

Rodriguez Garcia, Rolando. "Rebelion en la Republica Auge y Caida de Gerardo Machado" Editorial Ciencias Sociales, 2013.
 Argote-Freyre, Frank.  Fulgencio Batista: Volume 1, From Revolutionary to Strongman.  Rutgers University Press, Rutgers, New Jersey.  .  2006. 
 Chester, Edmund A. A Sergeant Named Batista.  Holt. . 1954.
  (Spanish)

1874 births
1954 deaths
People from Camajuaní
Cuban people of Spanish descent
Presidents of Cuba
1930s in Cuba
20th-century Cuban politicians